Matthew Dixon (born 19 December 1994) is an English semi-professional footballer who plays as a midfielder for  club Whitby Town. He has played in the Football League for York City.

Dixon started his career with hometown club Hull City, signing a professional contract in May 2013. He had a loan spell with Conference North club Gainsborough Trinity in the 2014–15 season, before making his first-team debut for Hull in a League Cup match in August 2015. Dixon signed for League Two club York City in January 2016, although the club was relegated to the National League in 2015–16. He signed for National League club North Ferriby United in February 2017 before spending 2017–18 with National League North club Spennymoor Town.

Early life
Dixon was born in Kingston upon Hull, Humberside. He was raised in Brandesburton and attended Hornsea School.

Career

Hull City
Dixon began his career with Hull City's youth system at the age of eight and went on to captain the under-18 and under-21 teams. After progressing through the youth teams at the club, he signed a professional contract in May 2013. He joined Conference North club Gainsborough Trinity one a one-month loan on 23 December 2014, making his debut three days later starting in a 3–0 home win over North Ferriby United. Dixon finished the loan with seven appearances. He made his first-team debut for Hull on 11 August 2015 in a League Cup match against Accrington Stanley.

York City
Dixon signed for League Two club York City on 15 January 2016 on a one-and-a-half-year contract on a free transfer. He was signed as a replacement for Ben Godfrey, who had left York for Premier League club Norwich City. His debut came on 23 January 2016 as a starter in York's 1–1 away draw with Carlisle United, and manager Jackie McNamara commented that he was "excellent for his debut and passed the ball well on a difficult afternoon". According to Dave Flett of The Press, however, Dixon "found it difficult to impose himself on proceedings", and that he would "need to come to terms with the speed of the professional game if he is to progress next season". He made seven appearances for York in 2015–16 as they were relegated to the National League after finishing bottom of League Two.

In January 2017, Dixon was told he was surplus to requirements by York manager Gary Mills. Having made 14 appearances in 2016–17, Dixon left York by mutual consent on 3 February 2017.

Later career

Dixon signed for National League club North Ferriby United on 7 February 2017. He finished 2016–17 with 15 appearances for North Ferriby, as the club was relegated to the National League North with a bottom-place ranking in the National League. Dixon signed for newly promoted National League North club Spennymoor Town on 3 July 2017. He was released at the end of 2017–18.

After a successful trial, Dixon signed for newly promoted Northern Premier League Premier Division club Scarborough Athletic on 22 July 2018. He signed for Scarborough's divisional rivals Whitby Town on 12 June 2019.

Career statistics

References

External links

1994 births
Living people
Footballers from Kingston upon Hull
English footballers
Association football midfielders
Hull City A.F.C. players
Gainsborough Trinity F.C. players
York City F.C. players
North Ferriby United A.F.C. players
Spennymoor Town F.C. players
Scarborough Athletic F.C. players
Whitby Town F.C. players
National League (English football) players
English Football League players